Brickellia glandulosa is a Mesoamerican species of flowering plants in the family Asteraceae. It is widespread from San Luis Potosí south to Nicaragua.

References

glandulosa
Flora of Mexico
Flora of Central America
Plants described in 1824